Cudjoe is both a given name and surname. Notable people with the name include:

Cudjoe (c. 1680–1744), Jamaican Maroon leader
Cudjoe Lewis (1841–July 17, 1935), American slave
James Cudjoe (born 1971), Ghanaian artist
Joseph Cudjoe (footballer) (born 1995), Ghanaian footballer
Leroy Cudjoe (born 1988), English rugby league player
Sampson Cudjoe (born 1988), Ghanaian footballer
Selwyn Cudjoe (born 1943), Trinidadian academic
Vera Cudjoe (born 1928), Trinidadian-Canadian actress, producer, and educator